Europe's Biggest Dance Show 2021 was the fourth iteration of Europe's Biggest Dance Show, a multi-nation dance music simulcast hosted by BBC Radio 1, in collaboration with eight other radio stations from across Europe: 1LIVE, Fritz, NRK mP3, RTÉ 2FM, Studio Brussel, SR P3, YleX, and for the first time, FM4.

Background 
The simulcast started at 18:30 BST on 29 October 2021, but unlike in previous years, where every radio station contributed an hour, every radio station contributed 30 minutes of dance music from their respective country.

After broadcasting the October 2020 edition of the simulcast as part of its weekly dance music show La boum de luxe, Austria’s FM4 contributed for the first time.

Running order

See also 

 Europe's Biggest Dance Show 2019
 Europe's Biggest Dance Show 2020
 Europe's Biggest Dance Show 2022
 BBC Radio 1
 European Broadcasting Union

References 

BBC Radio 1 programmes
British music radio programmes
RTÉ 2fm programmes
Sveriges Radio programmes